The Espana Campeonato Nacional Liga (Spanish National Championship) is a rugby league competition that comprises six Spanish rugby league clubs. Launched in 2017, ahead of the 2017–18 season, the new format includes ten rounds, followed by playoffs and a final. Five of the clubs are from Valencia (Bufals, Ontinyent, Torrent, Valencia and Xativa), and Custodians Madrid are the representative of the capital region of Spain.

Seasons
2017-18 is the inaugural season of the Spanish Championship, though other domestic-level competitions have been played since 2013.

Teams
The 2019-20 lineup of teams is the following:

 Xativa Roosters
 Ontinyent 
 Custodians Madrid 
 Torrent Tigers 
 Valencian Warriors
 Bufals XIII

Schedule
The 2017–18 season's schedule features 4 rounds and a Christmas break, before returning for 6 rounds before finals.

See also

 Rugby league in Spain
 Spanish Campeonato Nacional Liga 2017-18

References

External links

Rugby league in Spain
Sports leagues established in 2017
2017 establishments in Spain
Sports leagues in Spain
European rugby league competitions